Jeremiah Clemens (1814–1865) was a U.S. Senator from Alabama from 1849 to 1853. Senator Clemens may also refer to:

Dan Clemens (1945–2019), Missouri State Senate
Jeff Clemens (born 1970), Florida State Senate

See also
Senator Clements (disambiguation)
A. C. Clemons (1921–1992), Louisiana State Senate